Manny S. Brown (1917-1987) was a member of the Wisconsin State Assembly.

Biography
Brown was born on November 2, 1917, in Chicago, Illinois. He graduated from the University of Wisconsin-Madison and Marquette University Law School and became a lawyer. During World War II, he served in the United States Navy. His son, Richard, is Chief Judge of the Wisconsin Court of Appeals. Brown died on April 7, 1987.

Political career
Brown was a member of the Assembly from 1962 to 1972. He was a Democrat.

References

Politicians from Chicago
Democratic Party members of the Wisconsin State Assembly
Wisconsin lawyers
Military personnel from Wisconsin
United States Navy sailors
United States Navy personnel of World War II
University of Wisconsin–Madison alumni
Marquette University Law School alumni
1917 births
1987 deaths
20th-century American politicians
20th-century American lawyers